The Federal Stock Number (FSN) was the codification system used by the U.S. federal government from 1955 to 1974. 

It was 11 digits long. The first four digits were the Federal Supply Classification Group (FSCG) code. This relates the item to the Federal Supply Group (FSG; digits 1 & 2) and Federal Supply Classification (FSC; digits 3 & 4) of similar items that it belongs to. The next seven digits were the unique item's serial number, or Federal Item Identification Number (FIIN).

It was designed to simplify and standardize the cataloging of common items in use by the Department of Defense. It replaced the earlier hodgepodge of cataloging systems in use. The Standard Nomenclature List (SNL) was created by the US Army Ordnance Corps in 1930 and was used until 1958. The Ammunition Identification Code (AIC) was a subset of the SNL concerning munitions and explosives that was used from January, 1942 to 1958. The SNL and AIC were listed in the Ordnance Supply Catalog, which was managed by the US Army Ordnance Corps. The Quartermaster Stock Number (QSN), which codified items by government contract number, was created by the Treasury Department in 1943; it was used by the US Army Quartermaster Corps officially from 1946 to 1956. The Medical Departments of the Army, Navy and Air Force each had their own systems as well.

The first attempt at an inter-service system was the Army-Navy Munitions Board, which would procure common items for the Army, Navy, and Marine Corps. Items received the prefix "AN/" (for Army & Navy) to indicate their common use (and procured items like radios and some hand-grenades still do to this day). This existed from 1940 to 1942 before falling into a deep bureaucratic hibernation until 1945. In 1946, it was renamed the Defense Munitions Board. In 1947 they created the Cataloging Agency, a subordinate entity in charge of managing the Joint Army-Navy Catalog System. The Cataloging Agency began using the Federal Stock Number system for the first time in 1949 (though not referred to as such), but the other systems were still in use.

The use of  a centralized system for defense procurement and issue was approved on July 1, 1952 with the passing of the Defense Cataloging And Standardization Act (Public Law 82-436) The first comprehensive Federal Catalog, which listed items by their FSN, was created in 1957. In 1958, the Armed Forces Supply Support Center (AFSSC) was created to manage the Federal Catalog.

The Federal Stock Number was officially replaced by the National Stock Number (NSN) beginning on September 30, 1974. The National Stock Number was the same number as the FSN, plus the two-digit National Codification Bureau (NCB) "Country Code" added between the FSCG code and the item code. The US government added the code numbers "00" in the place of the NCB digits to all FSN numbers to create compliant American NSN numbers. The National Item Identification Number (NIIN) is the two-digit Country Code plus the seven-digit Item Identification Code.

Examples

See also
List of NATO Supply Classification Groups
National Codification Bureau

References

External links
FSN Lookup
Free Public FSN Search Engine
What Is a National Stock Number?
FED LOG Search

United States Department of Defense
Military logistics of the United States
Identifiers